Raymond Clifford Cook (born August 20, 1936) is an American former professional baseball player who appeared in 163 games played over parts of five Major League Baseball seasons.

Career
A power hitter in minor league baseball, Cook made his Major League debut in September 1959 with the Cincinnati Reds after he had slugged 32 home runs in the Class A Sally League. In his second and third MLB games, when he played both ends of a doubleheader against the Chicago Cubs on September 10, 1959, at Wrigley Field, Cook had six hits in nine at bats, including a double and a triple, with four runs batted in. He also made two errors in the field. That torrid start at the plate enabled Cook to bat .381 during his nine-game late-season trial.

But for the rest of his MLB career, Cook would have trouble making consistent contact. Early in the  season, on May 7, he was traded to the New York Mets with left-handed pitcher Bob Miller for veteran infielder Don Zimmer. 

Overall, his big-league statistics were 163 games played, 398 at bats, 33 hits, 17 doubles, three triples, seven home runs, 35 RBI and a .201 batting average. He hit 195 home runs in the minor leagues, and retired from pro ball after the 1964 season.

References

External links

1936 births
Living people
Albuquerque Dukes players
Baseball players from Dallas
Buffalo Bisons (minor league) players
Cincinnati Reds players
Douglas Trojans players
Indianapolis Indians players
Major League Baseball outfielders
Major League Baseball third basemen
Moultrie Reds players
Nashville Vols players
New York Mets players
Savannah Redlegs players
Syracuse Chiefs players
Wausau Lumberjacks players